Rico Back (born 1954) is a German businessman. He is a founding member and former CEO of German Parcel (now GLS Group). He was also the CEO of Royal Mail from 2018 to 2020.

Early life
Rico Back was born in 1954 in Hamburg, Germany.

Career
In 1989, Back was a founding member and managing director of German Parcel, a European-wide parcel logistics firm. In 1999 Back led the sale of German Parcel to Royal Mail, subsequently rebranded as GLS. The company is now one of the largest ground-based deferred parcel networks in Europe.  Its revenues grew from £1 billion in 2002 to £3 billion in 2019.  It contributed 64% of Royal Mail Group's adjusted operating profit from 30% of group revenues. In 2019 the division was estimated to be worth £2 billion based on an operating profit of £180 million.

Back served as the CEO of GLS for 18 years before taking over as Royal Mail Group CEO in 2018. As CEO of Royal Mail Parcels (2016 to 2018), Back was responsible for all international activities as well as the national parcel business.[2] [3] He succeeded Moya Greene as Royal Mail CEO when she retired in June 2018. He received the same £790,000 pay and benefits package as Greene, plus a possible £1.3 million bonus and a £6 million golden hello; his personal taxes were paid in and to the UK.

During his tenure, UK parcel volume growth reached a four-year peak in 2018 and Royal Mail's share of the UK parcel market grew to 53% by volume by March 2018, driven by winning business from online retailers. In its 2019 full-year results, a year into Back's tenure as CEO, Royal Mail announced a five-year turnaround plan focused on expanding the company's parcels business internationally, addressing the growth in online deliveries. As part of the plan, Royal Mail pledged to invest a further £1.8 billion in its UK postal service.

On 15 May 2020, Back resigned as CEO of Royal Mail Group, with Keith Williams taking immediate control before being replaced as interim CEO by Stuart Simpson. His departure came as Royal Mail experienced a rise in parcel volumes and a downturn in letter volumes during the COVID-19 pandemic. The company's revenues annual revenues in April 2020 had fallen by £22 million against the previous year.

Personal life
Back and his family live in an apartment overlooking Lake Zurich, Switzerland, where they have been resident for more than ten years and where he is legally domiciled.

References

Living people
German chief executives
1954 births
Royal Mail people